The Knight's Ferry Bridge is a historic covered bridge spanning the Stanislaus River at Knights Ferry, California. Built in 1863, it is one of the best-preserved 19th-century wood-iron Howe truss bridges to survive. It was designated a U.S. National Historic Landmark in 2012.

Description and history
The Knight's Ferry Bridge stands at the eastern edge of the small community of Knights Ferry, spanning the Stanislaus River a short distance upriver from the modern Sonora Road bridge. In addition to spanning the river, the bridge crosses a historic millrace north of the river. The bridge sections consist of Howe trusses formed out of wooden planks bolted together, with wrought iron tension rods, all joined by wrought iron bearing blocks. The exterior of the bridge is finished in vertical board siding, with a metal roof.

The bridge, the second to stand on the site, was built in 1862–63, after the first bridge (built 1856) was swept away during the Great Flood of 1862. Because of this flood, the new bridge was built on higher piers. The bridge was for a long time known as the longest covered bridge west of the Mississippi River, and since the 2011 destruction of Old Blenheim Bridge in New York State, which had approximately the same length, it is the second-longest covered bridge in the United States, behind the Smolen-Gulf covered bridge in Ohio.

It was documented by the Historic American Buildings Survey and by the Historic American Engineering Record. In addition to its status as a National Historic Landmark, it is also listed on the National Register of Historic Places as a contributing structure in the Knight's Ferry historic district.

See also
List of bridges documented by the Historic American Engineering Record in California
List of bridges on the National Register of Historic Places in California
List of covered bridges in California
List of National Historic Landmarks in California
National Register of Historic Places listings in Stanislaus County, California

References

External links

Bridges completed in 1863
Covered bridges on the National Register of Historic Places in California
Historic American Buildings Survey in California
Historic American Engineering Record in California
National Historic Landmarks in California
National Register of Historic Places in Stanislaus County, California